Nat Butler was a Scottish snooker player. He competed in the first World Snooker Championship in 1927 and again in 1930. In 1927 he was defeated 3–8 to Tom Carpenter in the opening round. In 1930, he defeated Tom Newman 13–11 to reach the semi-finals, where he was defeated by Tom Dennis 11–13.

References

Scottish snooker players